Attila Farkas (born 5 October 1978) is a Hungarian football player who currently plays for Nyíregyháza Spartacus.

References
HLSZ
Lombard FC Papa Official Website
European Football clubs & Squads

1978 births
Living people
Sportspeople from Pyongyang
Hungarian footballers
Association football defenders
Budapesti VSC footballers
MTK Budapest FC players
BKV Előre SC footballers
FC Tatabánya players
Szombathelyi Haladás footballers
Lombard-Pápa TFC footballers
FC Sopron players
Nyíregyháza Spartacus FC players